César Ychikawa is a Peruvian singer who was the vocalist of the Peruvian pop rock band of the 1960s Los Doltons, integrated by Ychikawa, Walter Bolarte (lead guitar), Roberto Andia (2nd guitar), Fernando Bolarte (drums). He integrate the band since 1965 to 1968 replacing Gerardo Manuel. He later returned to Los Doltons.

Their best singles are “Visión De Otoño”, “El Juicio Final”, "Gloria", “La Ventana”, “Teresa”, “Amarrado”, “Nila” and “El Ultimo Beso”.

External links
  Especial Feria del Hogar

Peruvian people of Japanese descent
20th-century Peruvian male singers
20th-century Peruvian singers
1946 births
Living people